H. A. Lindsay (1900–1969) was an Australian writer for children who was born in Hyde Park, South Australia.

Life and career
As a child he was educated at Kyre College (now Scotch College, Adelaide).

He travelled widely in Australia before working as a commercial bee-keeper and farmer leading up to the Second World War. He enlisted in the Australian Imperial Force in 1942 and rose to warrant officer, class one, in the Australian Army Education Service where he taught the bushcraft he had learned on his pre-war travels.

After the war he became a full-time writer and broadcaster, writing regular columns for the Melbourne Age and Adelaide Sunday Advertiser newspapers, and for The Port Phillip Gazette.

He wrote five novels for adults and was awarded the Children's Book of the Year Award: Older Readers for his work The First Walkabout which he wrote with Norman B Tindale and published in 1954.

He died in Highgate, South Australia in 1969.

Bibliography

Novels 
 The Red Bull (1959)
 Sweeps the Wide Earth (1960)
 Janie McLachlan (1961)
 Faraway Hill (1963)
 And Gifts Misspent (1964)

Young adult fiction 
 The Arnhem Treasure (1952)
 The First Walkabout (1954) with Norman B Tindale
 Rangatira (1960) with Norman B Tindale

Non-fiction 
 Aboriginal Australians (1963) with Norman B Tindale
 "The Bushman's Handbook"  First edition 1948 Second edition 1951 Third Edition (Revised and reset) 1963

References

1900 births
1969 deaths
20th-century Australian novelists
Australian children's writers
Australian beekeepers
20th-century Australian non-fiction writers
20th-century Australian male writers
Australian male novelists
Australian male non-fiction writers
Writers from South Australia